Pistius truncatus is a species of crab spiders belonging to the family Thomisidae.

Description
The spider has small eyes and abdomen is much widened in females.

Adults can be found from May to June.

Distribution and habitat
This species has a palaearctic distribution. It is widespread in central and western Europe. It occurs in bushes, mainly in small scrubby oaks and in forest edges.

References

Spiders of Europe
Thomisidae
Spiders described in 1772
Palearctic spiders
Taxa named by Peter Simon Pallas